Emily Kernan Rutherfurd (born September 18, 1974) is an American actress. She played Christine "New Christine" Hunter in the CBS sitcom, The New Adventures of Old Christine (2006–10).

Personal life
Rutherfurd was born and raised in New York City, New York.  She is the daughter of Mary Spratt (née Kernan) Rutherfurd and Winthrop Rutherfurd Jr., himself the grandson of New York socialite Winthrop Rutherfurd (1862–1944).  Her paternal uncle is Lewis Polk Rutherfurd (b. 1944) who was married to Janet Jennings Auchincloss (1945–1985), the half-sister of former First Lady Jacqueline Kennedy Onassis, from 1966 until her death in 1985.

She attended Sacred Heart school on the Upper East Side. She also attended St. Mark's School in Southborough, Massachusetts. She then attended the University of Southern California in Los Angeles. She lives in Los Angeles with her husband, Rollin McCulloch "Loch" Gallagher IV, whom she married in 2003, and their daughters, Grace and Lila.

Career
Rutherfurd made her television debut in 1999 as a series regular on the short-lived CBS sitcom Work with Me opposite Nancy Travis and Kevin Pollak.  Later, she was a regular cast member on The Ellen Show and Married to the Kellys. 
She played Christine "New Christine" Hunter on the CBS sitcom The New Adventures of Old Christine which aired from 2006 to 2010 and also starred Julia Louis-Dreyfus. She had the lead role in Work Mom.

Rutherfurd starred in several television pilots, including The Assistants opposite Heather Locklear and an untitled comedy written by Ben Falcone. She had a recurring role on Will & Grace as a student in Jack McFarland's acting class, and also guest-starred on Last Man Standing, Drop Dead Diva and Hot in Cleveland. Her feature film credits include Elizabethtown, Van Wilder, and Pain & Gain.

Filmography

Film

Television

References

External links

20th-century American actresses
21st-century American actresses
1974 births
Actresses from New York City
American television actresses
Emily Kernan
Convent of the Sacred Heart (NYC) alumni
Living people
Emily Kernan
Emily Kernan
Emily Kernan
Schools of the Sacred Heart alumni
St. Mark's School (Massachusetts) alumni
Emily Kernan
University of Southern California alumni